Borzysław - is a Polish name of Slavic origin, built of two parts: bor = "war, fighter" and sław - "famous, glory". Feminine form is: Borzysława. Nicknames: Borek, Sławek. In other Slavic languages: Borislav. This name may refer to:

Following places:
Borzysław, Greater Poland Voivodeship (west-central Poland)
Borzysław, Pomeranian Voivodeship (north Poland)
Borzysław, West Pomeranian Voivodeship (north-west Poland)

See also

Borislav
Slavic names

Polish masculine given names
Slavic masculine given names